The 2003 Icelandic Men's Football League Cup was the eighth staging of the Icelandic Men's League Cup. It featured all the 2002 Úrvalsdeild karla teams and the top 6 teams from 1. deild karla in 2002.

The competition started on 21 February 2003  and concluded on 9 May 2003 with ÍA beating Keflavík 4-2 on penalties in the final.

Details
 The 16 teams were divided into 2 groups of 8 teams. Each team plays one match with other teams in the group once. The top 4 teams from each group qualified for the quarter-finals.

Group stage

Group A

Group B

Knockout stage

Quarter-finals

Semi-finals

Final

See also
Icelandic Men's Football Cup
Knattspyrnusamband Íslands - The Icelandic Football Association
Icelandic First Division League 2003

References
RSSSF Page - Deildabikar 2003

2003 domestic association football cups
2003 in Icelandic football
Icelandic Men's Football League Cup